Clube Desportivo Amabox (or Amabos) Barcelona Tarrafal (also in Portuguese for Barcelona, Capeverdean Crioulo, ALUPEC or ALUPEK: Barselona also in the São Vicente Crioulo) was a football (soccer) club that played in the Santiago Island League North in Cape Verde.  The team was based in the town of Tarrafal in the northern part of the island of Santiago.  The team was founded in 1995 and its logo and uniform rarely equals to that of the Spanish club Barcelona FC, it is predominantly different as the club is also known as Amabos Barcelona or Amabos Barcelona Tarrafal.  The team two titles, one in 2000 and their recent in 2003.  Since 2011/12, the club had been absent from Santiago North competition, and not long after, the club was dissolved, no merger was made.

The home stadium is the Municipal Stadium (Estádio Municipal) located roughly 1 km south on a branch road connecting the road to the national capital of Praia, its location is approximately halfway between Tarrafal and Chão Bom.

The club's greatest player was Janício Martins who played from 1997 to 2002.

Honours
 Santiago Island League (North): 2
1999/00, 2002/03

League and cup history

National championship

Island/Regional Championship

References

External links
Barcelona Tarrafal Blog 
Information about the club 

Football clubs in Santiago, Cape Verde
Tarrafal Municipality
1995 establishments in Cape Verde
Association football clubs established in 1995
2016 disestablishments in Cape Verde
Association football clubs disestablished in 2016
Defunct association football clubs